The Rajasthan Institute of Engineering and Technology is an institute run under the aegis of the Chandrawati Education Society, which has been in the field of education since 2000. The society is registered with the Registrar of Societies, Government of N.C.T. Delhi vide registration No. S.35514 of 1999, under the Societies Registration Act of 1860 with aim of providing quality technical education. The society established its first institution, Rajasthan Institute of Engineering and Technology (RIET), in 2000, with the approval of the All India Council for Technical Education (AICTE), Ministry of HRD, Government of India & NBA accredited.

Academics
The institute offers seven four-year undergraduate courses of study leading to the Bachelor of Technology degree in Computer Science Engineering, Electrical Engineering, Electronics and Communication, Information Technology, Mechanical Engineering, Civil Engineering & Electrical & Electronics Engineering.

Admissions to the institute are through the Joint Entrance Examination, [Rajasthan Engineering Admission Process], and Management Quota.

RIET, Jaipur, is a wireless Institute, with wired as well as wireless networks linking the entire campus.

Departments
Department of B.Tech
 Computer Science Engineering
 Electrical & Electronics Engineering
 Electronics and Communication Engineering
 Mechanical Engineering
 Information Technology
 Civil Engineering
 Electrical Engineering
 
Department of M.Tech

 Digital Communication
 Computer Science Engineering
 Power System
 Production Engineering
 VLSI Design
 Software Engineering

MBA

 Information Technology
 Finance
 Marketing
 HRM

MCA

Academic programs 
The institute conducts programs leading to the degree of Bachelor of Technology (B.Tech.), Master of Technology (MTech.), Master of Business Administration (M.B.A), and Master of Computer Applications (MCA) in the following areas.

Facilities
Library- The library has 30000 books in the fields of engineering, technology, management, and related areas. It has a subscription to E-journals (Science Direct option IV) and 85 technical magazines and national and international journals. A book bank facility is available for the students, also an SC/ST book bank. The library is computerized. It has a 6,000 sq ft (560 m2) area for reading and stacking area. It provides reading space for 100 readers at a time.

Digital Library- RIET Digital library has 1500 CDs and audio, and video aids with multimedia systems. The digital library is connected with other national and international libraries by DELNET and has a subscription to DEL (Digital Engineering Library) through the INDEST AICTE Consortium.

Canteen- The objective of the Canteen and meal service is to protect by reducing the risk of foodborne illness, with proper sanitary conditions and preventing adulterated food. From the very beginning of the College in 2000, the College Canteen has been functioning efficiently. The canteen is located inside the College. The hostellers and day scholars are provided meals to assuring food safety and quality.

Cafeteria- There is a common room and restroom for unwell day scholars. Lunch in the hostel is available for Day scholars.

Sports- There are facilities for boxing, cricket, basketball, volleyball, and table tennis.

Gymnasium- An air-conditioned gym has been added to both hostels.

Banks-Banks such as Axis Bank, HDFC, and SBI are within walking distance of the campus.

Wi-Fi Campus-RIET Campus is connected by 16 Mbit/s wireless internets available for students.

Air-Cooled Campus-RIET Campus is fully air-cooled.

CRT-Campus Recruitment Training Program is an innovative initiative that helps the student to achieve goals and enhance their employability skills. The CRT curriculum is designed in such a way that helps the students to come out of their weaknesses and explore their hidden skills. Students are charged 3500 extra for this.

Extracurricular activities
Cultural Society- For co-curricular activities, a cultural society was established in 2001. It conducts activities like quizzes, debates, seminars, extempore presentations, group discussions, and dance competitions.

Literary Club Hogwarts is an organization of students that conducts group discussions, mock interviews, debates, and quizzes for the personality and communication skill development of students.

National Service Scheme- NSS students participate in national programs like anti-dowry and AIDS prevention programs.

Technical Society of RIET Technodiction is a national-level tech fest that organizes tech events like technical quizzes, paper presentations, software presentations, and hardware.

Sports Club RIET students are encouraged to participate in sports. There are facilities for cricket, volleyball, basketball, table tennis & badminton.

Student Activity Centre RIET's Novel initiative is to harbor and harness the talent, leadership skills, and organizational skills of its student and utilize it for the all-around development of every individual within its being. SAC is not an organization but it is an open forum inviting everyone. It not only provides students with activities and platforms, but it also teaches them to win and add meaning to their efforts and dreams. SAC received appreciation and recommendations from the government and different sections of society.

See also

 List of universities in India
 Universities and colleges in India
 Education in India
 University Grants Commission (India)

References

External links
 RIET home page
 Mission & Vision

Engineering colleges in Jaipur
Educational institutions established in 2000
2000 establishments in Rajasthan